Whitney Lakes Provincial Park is a provincial park located in Alberta, Canada. It is located in the southeastern part of the County of St. Paul No. 19.

It was established on June 23, 1982.

See also
List of provincial parks in Alberta
List of Canadian provincial parks
List of National Parks of Canada

External links
Alberta Development - Whitney Lakes Provincial Park

Provincial parks of Alberta
County of St. Paul No. 19